Justice Combs may refer to:

Dan Jack Combs, associate justice of the Kentucky Supreme Court
Doug Combs, associate justice and chief justice of the Oklahoma Supreme Court
Sara Walter Combs, associate justice and chief justice of the Kentucky Court of Appeals

See also
William H. Coombs, associate justice of the Supreme Court of Indiana